Vasil Evstatiev Aprilov (21 July 1789 – 2 October 1847) was a Bulgarian educator. He studied in Moscow, graduated from a high school in Braşov and then pursued a medical degree in Vienna. After 1811 he was a merchant in Odessa. He initially participated in the Greek revolutionary movement, but later devoted himself to the Bulgarian Renaissance, thanks to Yuriy Venelin, whose book "The Ancient and Present Bulgarians" (1829), aroused in Imperial Russia a special interest in them. From then on, he began to gather Bulgarian folk songs. In his will he left a large amount of money for building the Aprilovska High School in Gabrovo. This was to be the first Bulgarian secular school using the Bell-Lancaster method. The emergence of this school gave a boost to Bulgarian education and soon other schools were opened all over the Bulgarian-populated regions of the Ottoman empire.

Aprilov Point on Greenwich Island, South Shetland Islands, Antarctica is named for Vasil Aprilov.

References

External links
 

People from Gabrovo
1789 births
1847 deaths
19th-century Bulgarian educators
Bulgarian philanthropists
19th-century deaths from tuberculosis
Expatriates from the Ottoman Empire in the Russian Empire
19th-century philanthropists
Tuberculosis deaths in Romania